John L. Bissant (February 19, 1914 - April 1, 2006) was an American baseball outfielder in the Negro leagues. He played professionally from 1934 to 1947. Bissant played mostly for the Chicago American Giants, for whom he played for in 1934, 1939, and from 1942 to 1947.

References

External links
 and Seamheads 
NLBPA.com
Obituary

1914 births
2006 deaths
Chicago American Giants players
Birmingham Black Barons players
Baseball players from Louisiana
20th-century African-American sportspeople
Baseball outfielders
21st-century African-American people